Prendeville (also spelled Prindiville, Prenderville, or Prendiville) is a surname of Irish/Norman origins. The name is found predominantly in County Kerry, Ireland although like many other surnames the Irish diaspora has led to it being spread around the world. It is thought to derive from the French/Norman surname, de Frondeville.

Notable individuals with the name include:

Antonio Valli Prendeville, leader of New Zealand's largest trade union (coal miners) for 30+ years
Andrew Prendeville, American indy racing driver
Colin Prenderville, Gaelic footballer
Kieran Prendiville, television script writer, best known for the series Ballykissangel (brother of Paddy Prendiville)
Neil Prendeville, presenter on the radio station Red FM in Cork 
Paddy Prenderville, editor of The Phoenix, Irish satirical magazine
Redmond Prendiville, Catholic archbishop of Perth
Walter Prendiville, Consultant Obstetrician involved in medical peer review of Neary case and brother of Kieran and Paddy.

References